Johann Georg Zobel von Giebelstadt (1543–1580) was the Prince-Bishop of Bamberg from 1577 to 1580.

Biography

Johann Georg Zobel von Giebelstadt was born on 20 July 1543 to Hans Zobel von Giebelstadt and Apollonia (born von Bibra).  He was elected Prince-Bishop of Bamberg on 20 August 1577, with Pope Gregory XIII confirming his appointment on 29 January 1578.  He was ordained as a priest but never consecrated as a bishop.

He died on 7 September 1580 and is buried in Michaelsberg Abbey, Bamberg.

References

External link

1580 deaths
Prince-Bishops of Bamberg
Year of birth unknown
1543 births